The Smell of Gum Leaves is the second solo live album by Australian country music artist John Williamson. The album was released in September 1984 and become Williamsons' first charting album; peaking at number 49 on the Kent Music Report.

At the Country Music Awards of Australia in January 1985, Williamson won his first golden guitar award; winning 'Song of the Year' for "Queen in the Sport of Kings".

The album was re-released in 1997 under the title Home Among the Gum Trees.

Track listing

Charts

Release history

References

1984 live albums
Live albums by Australian artists
Festival Records live albums
John Williamson (singer) albums